David C. Martin was a state senator representing Alachua County and served as clerk and treasurer of  Gainesville, Florida.

He was photographed with other politicians on the Florida State Capitol steps in Tallahassee in 1885.

References

Florida state senators
19th-century American politicians
Year of birth missing
Year of death missing
People from Alachua County, Florida